Santa Úrsula (named after Saint Ursula) is a town and a municipality on the north coast of Tenerife. It is located 6 km east of Puerto de la Cruz and 24 km west of the island's capital, Santa Cruz de Tenerife. The population is 14,545 (2013) and the area is 22.59 km². The elevation is 290 m. The TF-5 motorway passes through the municipality.

Historical population

See also
List of municipalities in Santa Cruz de Tenerife

References 

Municipalities in Tenerife